Germacrene A hydroxylase is an enzyme with systematic name (+)-germacrene-A,NADPH:oxygen oxidoreductase (12-hydroxylating). This enzyme catalyses the following chemical reaction

 (+)-germacrene A + NADPH + H+ + O2  germacra-1(10),4,11(13)-trien-12-ol + NADP+ + H2O

Germacrene A hydroxylase is a heme-thiolate protein (P-450).

References

External links 
 

EC 1.14.13